Anna Johnson may refer to:
 Anna Johnson Pell Wheeler,  American mathematician
Anna Johnson Gates, suffragist and politician

See also
Anna Johnston (disambiguation)
Ann Johnson (disambiguation)
Johnson